Moonlight Mile can refer to:
Moonlight Mile (film), a 2002 movie written and directed by Brad Silberling
Moonlight Mile (manga), a manga and anime series
Moonlight Mile (novel), the sixth novel in the Kenzie-Gennaro series by Dennis Lehane
"Moonlight Mile" (song),  song from The Rolling Stones' 1971 release Sticky Fingers